Petersburg, New Jersey may refer to:

 Petersburg, Cape May County, New Jersey
 Petersburg, Morris County, New Jersey

See also
Petersburg (disambiguation)